Charles F. Mahoney (March 23, 1920 – July 20, 1999) was an American stock car racing driver.

Racing career
One of the pioneers of the Grand National Series, he competed in 16 races over the first eight years of the sport, with a best finish of second at the Charlotte Speedway in 1950. Mahoney finished 5th in NASCAR's inaugural superspeedway race, the 1950 Southern 500, and ultimately finished 7th in the driver standings for that year. 

Mahoney won his first race in the NASCAR Sportsman Division (predecessor of the Xfinity Series) at Sandy Creek on June 15, 1950, and spent the majority of his career racing in the Sportsman and Modified classes at the renowned tracks of the northeast, including Fonda Speedway, Langhorne Speedway, Oswego Speedway, Spencer Speedway, Utica-Rome Speedway, and Watertown Speedway.

Mahoney, who introduced stock car racing on ice on Oneida Lake in central New York, also promoted racing at two tracks in upstate New York after he retired from driving.  He died in 1999 of a heart attack.

Motorsports career results

NASCAR
(key) (Bold – Pole position awarded by qualifying time. Italics – Pole position earned by points standings or practice time. * – Most laps led.)

Grand National Series

References

NASCAR drivers